Marquess (marquis) is a hereditary title of nobility.

Marquess may also refer to:

People with the surname Marquess
Mark Marquess (born 1947), American baseball coach
Mark Marquess (ice hockey) (1925–2015), Canadian ice hockey player
Matt Marquess (born 1986), American soccer player
Paul Marquess (born 1964), British television producer

Places
Marquess, West Virginia, an unincorporated community in Preston County, West Virginia

Transportation
 Marquis (HBC vessel), operated by the HBC from 1882-1886, see Hudson's Bay Company vessels

Other uses
Marquess (band), a German Latin-pop band
Marquess (album), their first studio album

See also

Marques (disambiguation)
Marquee (disambiguation)
Marquesas Islands
List of marquesses in the peerages of the British Isles
List of marquesses in Portugal
Marchioness (disambiguation), feminine of marquess
Marquis (disambiguation)
Margrave (disambiguation), equivalent of marquess
Markgraf (disambiguation), equivalent of marquess
March (disambiguation), territory of a marquess (marchion)